William Caxton (  – ) was an English merchant, diplomat and writer. He is thought to be the first person to introduce a printing press into England, in 1476, and as a printer to be the first English retailer of printed books.

His parentage and date of birth are not known for certain, but he may have been born between 1415 and 1424, perhaps in the Weald or wood land of Kent, perhaps in Hadlow or Tenterden. In 1438 he was apprenticed to Robert Large, a wealthy London silk mercer.

Shortly after Large's death, Caxton moved to Bruges, Belgium, a wealthy cultured city in which he was settled by 1450. Successful in business, he became governor of the Company of Merchant Adventurers of London; on his business travels, he observed the new printing industry in Cologne, which led him to start a printing press in Bruges in collaboration with Colard Mansion. When Margaret of York, sister of Edward IV, married the Duke of Burgundy, they moved to Bruges and befriended Caxton. Margaret encouraged Caxton to complete his translation of the Recuyell of the Historyes of Troye, a collection of stories associated with Homer's Iliad, which he did in 1471.

On his return to England, heavy demand for his translation prompted Caxton to set up a press at Westminster in 1476. Although the first book that he is known to have produced was an edition of Chaucer's The Canterbury Tales, he went on to publish chivalric romances, classical works and English and Roman histories and to edit many others. He was the first to translate Aesop's Fables in 1484. Caxton was not an adequate translator, and under pressure to publish as much as possible as quickly as possible, he sometimes simply transferred French words into English; but because of the success of his translations, he is credited with helping to promote the Chancery English that he used to the status of standard dialect throughout England.

In 2002, Caxton was named among the 100 Greatest Britons in a BBC poll.

Biography

Early life
Caxton's family "fairly certainly" consisted of his parents, Philip and Dionisia, and a brother, Philip. However, the charters used as evidence there are for the manor of Little Wratting in Suffolk; in one charter, this William Caxton is referred to as "otherwise called Causton saddler".

One possible candidate for William's father is Thomas Caxton of Tenterden, Kent, who was like William, a mercer. He was one of the defendants in a case in the Court of Common Pleas in Easter term 1420: Kent. John Okman, versus "Thomas Kaxton, of Tentyrden, mercer", and Joan who was the wife of Thomas Ive, executors of Thomas Ive, for the return of two bonds (scripta obligatoria) which they unjustly retain.

Caxton's date of birth is unknown. Records place it in 1415–1424, based on the fact that his apprenticeship fees were paid in 1438. Caxton would have been 14 at the date of apprenticeship, but masters often paid the fees late. In the preface to his first printed work The Recuyell of the Historyes of Troye, he claims to have been born and educated in the Weald of Kent. Oral tradition in Tonbridge claims that Caxton was born there; the same with Tenterden. One of the manors of Hadlow was Caustons, owned by the Caxton (De Causton) family. A house in Hadlow reputed to be the birthplace of William Caxton was dismantled in 1936 and incorporated into a larger house rebuilt in Forest Row, East Sussex. Further evidence for Hadlow is that various place names nearby are frequently mentioned by Caxton.

Caxton was in London by 1438, when the registers of the Mercers' Company record his apprenticeship to Robert Large, a wealthy London mercer or dealer in luxury goods, who served as Master of the Mercers' Company, and Lord Mayor of London in 1439. After Large died in 1441, Caxton was left a small sum of money (£20). As other apprentices were left larger sums, it would seem that he was not a senior apprentice at this time.

Printing and later life

Caxton was making trips to Bruges by 1450 and had settled there by 1453, when he may have taken his Liberty of the Mercers' Company. There, he was successful in business and became governor of the Company of Merchant Adventurers of London. His trade brought him into contact with Burgundy and it was thus that he became a member of the household of Margaret, Duchess of Burgundy, the third wife of Charles the Bold and sister of two kings of England: Edward IV and Richard III. That led to more continental travel, including to Cologne, in the course of which he observed the new printing industry and was significantly influenced by German printing.

He wasted no time in setting up a printing press in Bruges in collaboration with a Fleming, Colard Mansion, and the first book to be printed in English was produced in 1473: Recuyell of the Historyes of Troye was a translation by Caxton himself. In the epilogue of the book, Caxton tells how his "pen became worn, his hand weary, his eye dimmed" with copying the book by hand and so he "practiced and learnt" how to print it. His translation had become popular in the Burgundian court, and requests for copies of it were the stimulus for him to set up a press.

Bringing the knowledge back to England, he set up the country's first-ever press in The Almonry area of Westminster in 1476. The first book known to have been produced there was an edition of Chaucer's The Canterbury Tales (Blake, 2004–07). Another early title was Dictes or Sayengis of the Philosophres (Sayings of the Philosophers), first printed on 18 November 1477, translated by Earl Rivers, the king's brother-in-law. Caxton's translations of the Golden Legend (1483) and The Book of the Knight in the Tower (1484) contain perhaps the earliest verses of the Bible to be printed in English. He produced the first translation of Ovid's Metamorphoses in English. His translation of the Golden Legend was based on the French translation of Jean de Vignay.

Caxton produced chivalric romances (such as Fierabras), the most important of which was Sir Thomas Malory's Le Morte d'Arthur (1485); classical works; and English and Roman histories. These books appealed to the English upper classes in the late 15th century. Caxton was supported by (but not dependent on) members of the nobility and the gentry. He may also have been paid by the authors of works such as Lorenzo Gulielmo Traversagni, who wrote the Epitome margaritae eloquentiae, which Caxton published .

The John Rylands Library in Manchester holds the second-largest collection of printing by Caxton, after the British Library's collection. Of the Rylands collection of more than 60 examples 36 are complete and unsophisticated copies and four are unique.

Death and memorials

Caxton's precise date of death is uncertain, but estimates from the records of his burial in St. Margaret's, Westminster, suggest that he died near March 1492. However, George D. Painter makes numerous references to the year 1491 in his book William Caxton: a biography as the year of Caxton's death since 24 March was the last day of the year according to the calendar that used at the time and so the year change had not yet happened. Painter writes, "However, Caxton's own output reveals the approximate time of his death, for none of his books can be later than 1491, and even those which are assignable to that year are hardly enough for a full twelve months' production; so a date of death towards autumn of 1491 could be deduced even without confirmation of documentary evidence."

In 1820, a memorial tablet to Caxton was provided in St Margaret's by the Roxburghe Club and its President, Earl Spencer.

In November 1954, a memorial to Caxton was unveiled in Westminster Abbey by J. J. Astor, chairman of the Press Council. The white stone plaque is on the wall next to the door to Poets' Corner. The inscription reads:

Caxton and English language
Caxton printed 80 per cent of his works in the English language. He translated a large number of works into English and performed much of the translation and the editing work himself. He is credited with printing as many as 108 books, 87 of which were different titles, including the first English translation of Aesop's Fables (26 March 1484). Caxton also translated 26 of the titles himself. His major guiding principle in translating was an honest desire to provide the most linguistically exact replication of foreign language texts into English, but the hurried publishing schedule and his inadequate skill as a translator often led to wholesale transference of French words into English and to numerous misunderstandings.

The English language was changing rapidly in Caxton's time, and the works that he was given to print were in a variety of styles and dialects. Caxton was a technician, rather than a writer, and he often faced dilemmas concerning language standardisation in the books that he printed. He wrote about that subject in the preface to his Eneydos. His successor Wynkyn de Worde faced similar problems.

Caxton is credited with standardising the English language through printing by homogenising regional dialects and largely adopting the London dialect. That facilitated the expansion of English vocabulary, the regularisation of inflection and syntax and a widening gap between the spoken and the written words. Richard Pynson started printing in London in 1491 or 1492 and favoured what came to be called Chancery Standard, largely based on the London dialect. Pynson was a more accomplished stylist than Caxton and consequently pushed the English language further toward standardisation.

It is asserted that the spelling of "ghost" with the silent letter h was adopted by Caxton from the influence of Flemish spelling habits.

Caxton's "egges" anecdote

In Caxton's prologue to the 1490 edition of his translation of Virgil's Aeneid, called by him Eneydos, he refers to the problems of finding a standardised English. Caxton recounts what took place when a boat sailing from London to Zeeland was becalmed, and landed on the Kent side of the Thames.

A mercer called Sheffield was from the north of England. He went into a house and asked the "good wyf" if he could buy some "egges". She replied that she could not speak French, which annoyed him, as he could also not speak French. A bystander suggested that Sheffield was asking for "eyren", which the woman said she understood. After recounting the interaction, Caxton wrote: "Loo what ſholde a man in thyſe dayes now wryte egges or eyren/ certaynly it is harde to playſe euery man/ by cauſe of dyuerſite ⁊ chaũge of langage" ("Lo, what should a man in these days now write: egges or eyren? Certainly it is hard to please every man because of diversity and change of language").

References

Sources

Chisholm, Hugh, ed. (1911). "Caxton, William". Encyclopædia Britannica. 5 (11th ed.). Cambridge University Press. pp. 587–588.
 * Day, Matthew. “William Caxton and Vernacular Classicism.” English Studies 103, no. 1 (2022): 19–41.
 

Knight, Charles (1844). William Caxton: The First English Printer. A Biography. Charles Knight & Co.
Lee, Sidney (1887). "Caxton, William". In Dictionary of National Biography. 9. London. pp. 381–389.
Loades, David, ed. Reader's Guide to British History (2003) 1: 236-37.

Plomer, Henry R. (1925). William Caxton (1424-1491). Leonard Parsons
Plomer, Henry R. (1925). Wynkyn de Worde & His Contemporaries, from the Death of Caxton to 1535. A Chapter in English Printing. Grafton & Co.
Stuart, Dorothy Margaret. (1960). "William Caxton: Mercer, Translator, and Master Printer" History Today 10:4 pp. 256–264.

External links

 
 
 Dictes or Sayengis of the Philosophres
 
 Caxton's Canterbury Tales from the British Library
 Selected works, printed by Caxton from the Folger Shakespeare Library's digital image collection
The Game and Playe of the Chesse. Introduction and text, part of the TEAMS Middle English Texts Series

Works published by Caxton from the Rare Book and Special Collections Division at the Library of Congress
 A book of the chesse moralysed 
 AL Ingratitude vtterly settying apart, we owe to calle to our myndes the manyfolde gyftes of grace ... 
 Cordiale quattuor novissimorum. 
 Here begynneth the prohemye vpon the reducynge, both out of latyn as of frensshe in to our englyssh tongue of the polytyque book named Tullius de senectute. 
 Here begynneth the table of the rubrices of this presente volume named the Mirrour of the World or thymage of the same. 
 Livre des faits d'armes et de chevalerie 
 The recuyles or gaderige to gyder of ye hystoryes of Troye...

15th-century English writers
English translators
15th-century translators
1492 deaths
15th-century births
English book publishers (people)
English printers
15th-century English people
People from Kent
Printers of incunabula
Translators to English
People of the Tudor period
People from Hadlow
15th-century printers
Translators of Virgil
Burials at St Margaret's, Westminster